Israel Itskovich Brekhman (20 November 1921–9 July 1994) was a Russian pharmacologist. He specialized in adaptogens, with a focus on Panax Ginseng and especially Siberian ginseng. Brekhman was highly awarded by both the Soviet Union and later by the Russian Federation for his research. He was a recipient of Order of Lenin.

References
 
 Winston, David & Maimes, Steven. “ADAPTOGENS: Herbs for Strength, Stamina, and Stress Relief,” Healing Arts Press, 2007. Contains a chapter on "History of Adaptogens" that discusses Brekhman's work with herbal adaptogens in Russia.

1921 births
1994 deaths
Russian pharmacologists
Soviet pharmacologists